Pixie, in comics, may refer to:

Pixie (X-Men), a Marvel Comics character associated with the X-Men and their family of titles
Pixie (Morlock), a member of the Marvel Comics group of mutants known as the Morlocks
Pixie (Eternal), a Marvel Comics character most prominently featured in the series, Marvel: The Lost Generation
Pixy, a graphic novel by the Swedish cartoonist, Max Andersson
Wasp (comics), was given the alias of "Pixie" in the alternate universe of Morgan Le Fay in Marvel Comics' Avengers vol. 3 #2-3

See also
Pixie (disambiguation)

fr:Pixie (comics)
it:Pixie (fumetto)
pt:Fada (Marvel Comics)
ru:Эльф (комикс)